Fernando Miranda may refer to:

 Fernando Miranda y Casellas (1842-1925), Spanish-American sculptor
 Fernando Miranda (sport shooter) (born 1939), Puerto Rican sports shooter
 Fernando Cornejo Miranda (born 1995), Chilean footballer
 Fernando Miranda (footballer) (born 1997), Argentine footballer